Mount English is a  mountain summit located in the Gold Range of the Monashee Mountains of British Columbia, Canada. Precipitation runoff from Mount English drains into tributaries of the Eagle River.

Etymology
Mount English was named to remember George Melville English (1918–1943), a Canadian Army Sergeant from Revelstoke. He served with the Royal Canadian Artillery, but he died September 15, 1943, age 24, in an automobile accident. The mountain's toponym was officially adopted April 29, 1965, by the Geographical Names Board of Canada.

Climate
Based on the Köppen climate classification, Mount English is located in a subarctic climate zone with cold, snowy winters, and mild summers. Winter temperatures can drop below −20 °C with wind chill factors below −30 °C. Despite the modest elevation, the climate supports an unnamed glacier on the northeast slope.

See also

Geography of British Columbia

Gallery

References

External links
 Weather forecast: Mount English

Two-thousanders of British Columbia
Monashee Mountains
Kamloops Division Yale Land District